Przyborów  is a village in the administrative district of Gmina Słońsk, within Sulęcin County, Lubusz Voivodeship, in western Poland.

See also
Territorial changes of Poland after World War II

References

Villages in Sulęcin County